Eugene Earle Larimore (August 2, 1899 – October 22, 1947) was an American stage and film actor.

Biography
Larrimore was born in Portland, Oregon, in 1899. He was a cousin of actress Laura Hope Crews. He began his career as a stage actor, appearing on Broadway in various plays, such as Made in America (1925), and The Love City (1926). In 1932, he starred opposite Ruth Gordon in William Cotton's The Bride the Sun Shines On at the Cape Playhouse in Dennis, Massachusetts, and as Orin Mannon in the original Broadway production of Mourning Becomes Electra. The same year, Larrimore married actress Selena Royle. He starred opposite Tallulah Bankhead in the Broadway production of Dark Victory in 1934.

In 1935, Larrimore and Royle formed the University Players repertory company at the Ford's Theatre in Washington, D.C. Larrimore and Royle eventually divorced in 1942. Larrimore died in New York City on October 22, 1947.

Filmography

Stage credits

References

External links

1899 births
1947 deaths
American male film actors
American male stage actors
Male actors from Portland, Oregon
20th-century American male actors